Francesco Bonfiglio (born 20 January 1997) is an Italian football player. He plays for SC Palazzolo.

Club career
He made his Serie C debut for Sicula Leonzio on 23 September 2017 in a game against Bisceglie.

On 7 December 2018, he signed with Serie D club Marsala. On 10 August, he then joined ASD Marina di Ragusa Calcio. He left the club in December 2019, to join SC Palazzolo.

References

External links
 

1997 births
Footballers from Palermo
Living people
Italian footballers
Association football forwards
Palermo F.C. players
U.C. AlbinoLeffe players
Serie C players
Serie D players
A.S.D. S.C. Palazzolo players